Annie Smith may refer to: 

Annie Smith (athlete) (born 1939), American long jumper 
Annie R. Smith (1828–1855), Seventh-day Adventist hymn writer
Annie Morrill Smith (1856–1946), American botanist
Annie Lorrain Smith (1854–1937), British lichenologist
Annie Smith (EastEnders), fictional character in the soap opera EastEnders

See also
Annie Smith Peck (1850–1935), U.S. mountaineer
Anne Smith (disambiguation)
Anna Smith (disambiguation)